Huffman may refer to:


Places

United States
 Huffman, Indiana, an unincorporated community
 Huffman, Texas, an unincorporated community
 Huffman, Virginia, an unincorporated community
 Huffman, West Virginia, an unincorporated community

Antarctica
 Mount Huffman, Ellsworth Land

People
 Huffman (surname), a surname
 Huffman Eja-Tabe (born 1981), Cameroonian footballer in North America

Other uses
 Huffman Bros. Motor Co, 1920s Indiana-based car company
 Huffman High School, Birmingham, Alabama
 Huffman Manufacturing Company, former name of the Huffy Corporation, a bicycle manufacturer based in Dayton, Ohio

See also
 Huffman coding, a data compression algorithm (Huffman tree) by David A. Huffman
 Huffman Dam, near Fairborn, Ohio
 Huffman Historic District, Dayton, Ohio, on the National Register of Historic Places
 Huffman Prairie, Ohio, also known as Huffman Field, a field used by the Wright brothers for testing and training
Hoffman (disambiguation)